A layover is a point where a vehicle stops, with passengers possibly changing vehicle.

Layover may also refer to:
Layover (novel), a 1999 novel by Lisa Zeidner
 The Layover (TV series), an American travel and food show
The Layover EP, a 2008 hip-hop EP by Evidence
The Layover (film), a 2017 film directed by William H. Macy
Layover, alternative title for the 2012 tele-movie Abducted with Lauren Holly

See also

 Overlay (disambiguation)
 Over (disambiguation)
 Lay (disambiguation)